Pushpa Devi is an Indian politician and an MLA elected from Chatarpur block of Jharkhand state as a member of Bharatiya Janata Party 2019.

References

Living people
21st-century Indian politicians
Lok Sabha members from Jharkhand
People from Palamu district
Bharatiya Janata Party politicians from Jharkhand
Date of birth missing (living people)
Place of birth missing (living people)
Year of birth missing (living people)